Yatsura may refer to:
Yelena Yatsura (born 1968), Russian film producer
Urusei Yatsura (band), a Scottish band which used the name Yatsura in the United States and Japan

See also
Urusei Yatsura, a Japanese manga and anime franchise